Tom Austin may refer to:

 Tom Austin (baseball), baseball coach
 Tom Austin (musician), drummer with The Royal Teens
 Tom Austin (politician) (1923–2002), Australian politician

See also
Tom Austen (born 1987), English actor